Ancylolomia orchidea is a moth in the family Crambidae. It was described by Stanisław Błeszyński in 1970. It is found on Luzon in the Philippines.

References

Ancylolomia
Moths described in 1970
Moths of Asia